Kipchak-Askarovo (Qıpsaq-Asqar) is a rural locality (a selo) and the administrative center of Kipchak-Askarovsky Selsoviet, Alsheyevsky District, Bashkortostan, Russia. The population was 656 as of 2010. There are 7 streets.

Geography 
Kipchak-Askarovo is located 22 km south of Rayevsky (the district's administrative centre) by road. Saryshevo is the nearest rural locality.

References 

Rural localities in Alsheyevsky District